Andrew Rothenberg (born January 26, 1969) is an American stage, television and film actor. Rothenberg is known for recurring roles in major television series, including Agent Phil Schlatter on Weeds and his portrayal of Malcolm on the HBO vampire series True Blood. Rothenberg portrayed Jim, a survivor of a zombie apocalypse in the first season of the AMC television series The Walking Dead based on the comic book series of the same name. Rothenberg also voiced and motion captured the character of Stuart Ackerman in the video game L.A. Noire.

Filmography

Film

Television

References

External links

1969 births
American male film actors
American male television actors
American male stage actors
Living people
20th-century American male actors
People from Los Angeles County, California
21st-century American male actors